William Penn University is a private university in Oskaloosa, Iowa. It was founded by members of the Religious Society of Friends (Quakers) in 1873 as Penn College. In 1933, the name was changed to William Penn College, and finally to William Penn University in 2000.

History
Penn College opened September 24, 1873.  The college's name was changed from Penn College to William Penn College in 1933, sparking a controversy whether or not the institution had ceased to exist as an educational institution.  That matter was settled once and for all by the Iowa Supreme Court which ruled that Penn College had not ceased to exist as an educational institution.  In 2000, the name was changed again from William Penn College to William Penn University.

In 1916, fire destroyed the original campus and Penn's business manager Robert Williams and freshman student Harry Oakley were killed when the four-ton college bell crashed through the main building and buried them beneath it.

In 1995, William Penn's 'College for Working Adults' was founded, which enrolls non-traditional students in an evening program of accelerated study. In January 2000 the college returned to the NAIA Division II. William Penn is accredited by the Higher Learning Commission and a member of the North Central Association.

In 2007, Musco Lighting, also in Oskaloosa, donated $12 million to the school for various projects—the biggest single gift in the school's history.

Historic district
Part of the campus has been set aside as a nationally recognized historic district that was listed on the National Register of Historic Places in 1996.  At the time of its nomination it contained ten resources, which included one contributing site, four contributing buildings, two contributing structures, two non-contributing buildings, and one non-contributing structure.  The focus of the district is the Quadrangle, which is the contributing site.  Penn Hall (1917), Lewis Hall (1917), the Central Heating Plant (1917), and Spencer Memorial Chapel (1923) are the historic buildings.  The historic structures are two Memorial Gates (c. 1918). The Southeast Memorial Gate is located at the intersection of North Market Street and Trueblood Avenue.  The Southwest Memorial Gate is located at the entrance to a vehicular drive off of Trueblood Avenue.  They were gifts of the classes of 1918–1920 to honor their classmates who died in World War I.  Bloomington, Illinois architect A.T. Simmons designed the conceptual plan for the campus and the plans for individual buildings.  He also designed the memorial gates; which were erected on May 20, 1918.  The use of Prairie School architecture is an unusual choice for a collegiate setting, and it exemplifies how its influence grew beyond Illinois.   The Spencer Memorial Chapel is an exception.  It was designed by the prominent  Des Moines architectural firm of Proudfoot, Bird and Rawson in the Colonial Revival style.

Campus ministries
Per the school's website: "At William Penn University, students are encouraged, but not required, to participate in religious life programming. Programming sponsored by Campus Ministries is Christian in orientation and interdenominational in nature. Campus Ministry assists students to explore questions of faith in a nurturing environment and discover spiritual resources to face life's challenges."

Athletics
The William Penn athletic teams are called the Statesmen. The university is a member of the National Association of Intercollegiate Athletics (NAIA), primarily competing in the Heart of America Athletic Conference (HAAC) since the 2015–16 academic year. The Statesmen previously competed in the defunct Midwest Collegiate Conference (MCC) from 2001–02 to 2014–15 (when the conference dissolved); as well as in the Iowa Intercollegiate Athletic Conference (IIAC; now known as the American Rivers Conference since the 2018–19 academic year) of the NCAA Division III ranks from 1962–63 to 2000–01 (which they were a member on a previous stint from 1922–23 to 1953–54).

William Penn competes in 23 intercollegiate varsity sports: Men's sports include baseball, basketball, bowling, cross country, football, golf, lacrosse, soccer, track & field, volleyball and wrestling; while women's sports include basketball, bowling, cross country, golf, lacrosse, soccer, softball, track & field, volleyball and wrestling; and co-ed sports include cheer & dance and shotgun sports.

Men's basketball
The men's basketball teams have had significant success, finishing as the runner-up in the 2013 NAIA Division II men's basketball tournament. In 2014 William Penn set a record for points scored in the NAIA National Basketball Tournament.

Notable alumni 
 Joseph Benavidez, professional mixed martial artist
 Casey Fien, professional baseball player
 John M. Haines, tenth Governor of Idaho from 1913 to 1915
 Damon Harrison, professional football player
 Jerry Kutzler, professional baseball player
 Clarence E. Pickett, 20th-century American Quaker
 Lilly Peckham Pickett, 20th-century American Quaker, graduated in 1908
 Bruce Polen, college football player and coach
 Kevin Ritz, professional baseball player
 Andy Stokes, professional football player
 Rob Taylor, Iowa House of Representatives
 Ed Thomas, football coach
Antonio Pérez, Educator 
 D. Elton Trueblood, 20th-century American Quaker
 Abel Trujillo, four-time NAIA All-American wrestler; professional mixed martial artist
 Kamaru Usman, professional mixed martial artist, former UFC Welterweight Champion
 Wilbur Young, professional football player
 Miriam Were, Noble Peace Prize nominee

References

External links

 
 Official athletics website

 
Quaker universities and colleges
Liberal arts colleges in Iowa
Education in Mahaska County, Iowa
Oskaloosa, Iowa
Historic districts in Mahaska County, Iowa
Buildings and structures in Mahaska County, Iowa
Educational institutions established in 1873
National Register of Historic Places in Mahaska County, Iowa
University and college buildings on the National Register of Historic Places in Iowa
Historic districts on the National Register of Historic Places in Iowa
1873 establishments in Iowa
Private universities and colleges in Iowa